The Lim Dat Building is an historic building in Victoria, British Columbia, Canada. Built in 1898, it stands at the corner of Store and Fisgard Streets on the edge of Victoria's Chinatown area.

See also
 List of historic places in Victoria, British Columbia

References

External links
 

1898 establishments in Canada
Buildings and structures completed in 1898
Buildings and structures in Victoria, British Columbia